"Sally" is a song by Dutch DJ Hardwell. It features British singer Harrison. It is the fifth single from Hardwell's 2015 debut studio album United We Are.

Background 
Speaking about the term "Sally", Hardwell said "Sally is a term in the rock industry that (has) been used by the Beatles and Eric Clapton." The song was created as he announced his intentions to create a crossover song between EDM and rock.

Charts

References 

2015 songs
2015 singles
Hardwell songs
Songs written by Hardwell